Tetragonoderus flavovittatus is a species of beetle in the family Carabidae. It was described by C.O.Waterhouse in 1881.

References

flavovittatus
Beetles described in 1881